Oakley is a populated place in Pitt County, North Carolina, United States.

Geography

Oakley is located at latitude 35.757937 and longitude -77.2866307. The elevation is 62 feet.

Demographics

References

External links

Unincorporated communities in Pitt County, North Carolina
Unincorporated communities in North Carolina